Squash New Zealand is the governing body of squash in New Zealand. Founded in 1932, Squash New Zealand is affiliated to both the World Squash Federation and Oceania Squash.

Regional and club administration 
Squash New Zealand is responsible for the administration of squash in 11 regions, each of which is managed by a regional district administration.

There are currently 200 clubs affiliated to Squash New Zealand which collectively creates a network of 590 individual squash courts.

Honours and awards

National awards 
The Squash New Zealand National Awards have awarded since 1974. The award categories include:

 Chairman's Award
 Club of the Year
 Most Improved Player
 National Coaching Awards
 Personality of the Year
 Refereeing Awards
 Rob Roche Award (Meritorious Service to Masters)
 Volunteer of the Year

Hall of Fame 
Squash New Zealand is a sponsor of the New Zealand Squash Hall of Fame, established in 2009. The Hall currently has 30 inductees:

See also
 New Zealand men's national squash team
 New Zealand women's national squash team

References

External links
Official site

Squash in New Zealand
Squash organizations
New Zealand
1932 establishments in New Zealand
Sports organizations established in 1932
Sports governing bodies in New Zealand